Air Mali may refer to:

 Air Mali (1960–1989), the former national airline of Mali
 Air Mali (2005), a later Malian airline